Swythamley Hall is a late 18th-century country house near Leek, Staffordshire which has been converted into four separate residences. It is a Grade II listed building.

Originally a monastic Grange house and lands, the manor of Swythamley was held by the Crown following the dissolution of Dieulacres Abbey and thereafter had several owners. It was acquired by the Trafford family (who owned the adjoining manor of Heaton) in 1654. The Traffords replaced the old manor ( recorded in 1666 as taxable for 8 hearths) with a new house in about 1690. The family remained in residence until Edward Trafford Nicholls ( High Sheriff of Staffordshire in 1818) sold the estate to John Brocklehurst in 1832.  It was subsequently inherited by John's eldest son, William, and then William's nephew Philip Lancaster Brocklehurst (1827–1904) who was created a baronet in 1903.

The Brocklehursts considerably enlarged and improved the house during the 19th century including new wings and a two storey porch to the west entrance front.

On the death of the 2nd Baronet Philip Lee Brocklehurst in 1975 his heir and great nephew sold the house and broke up the estate. For some ten years the hall was occupied as a Transcendental Meditation training centre until in 1987 when it was sold for residential redevelopment. The Grade II listed coach house was also converted into a single residence, as was the Swythamley Chapel.

Notes

References

   'A History of the County of Stafford, Volume 7' (1996) pp 186-191  Manors of Heaton and Swythamley from British History Online

Grade II listed houses in Staffordshire
Transcendental Meditation
1690 establishments in England